The 2017 Tippmix László Killik Nőii Magyar Kupa was the 51st season of the Hungarian Basketball Cup.

Bracket

Matches

Bronze medal match

Final

See also
 2016–17 Nemzeti Bajnokság I/A

References

External links
 Official website
 Hungarian Basketball Federaration
 wbasket.hu

Magyar Kupa women